The 2018 37 Kind Days 250 was the 6th stock car race of the 2018 NASCAR Camping World Truck Series season, and the 18th iteration of the event. The event was held on Friday, May 11, 2018 in Kansas City, Kansas at Kansas Speedway. The race rook 167 laps to complete. Noah Gragson of Kyle Busch Motorsports would dominate the race, and eventually win the race, the first and only win of the season and the second of his career. To fill out the podium, Kyle Busch of Kyle Busch Motorsports and Stewart Friesen of Halmar Friesen Racing finished 2nd and 3rd, respectively.

Background 

Kansas Speedway is a 1.5-mile (2.4 km) tri-oval race track in Kansas City, Kansas. It was built in 2001 and hosts two annual NASCAR race weekends. The NTT IndyCar Series also raced there until 2011. The speedway is owned and operated by the International Speedway Corporation.

Entry list

Practice

First and final practice 
The first and final practice was held on 10:35 AM CST.

Qualifying 
Qualifying would take place on Friday, May 11, at 4:05 PM CST. Since Kansas Speedway was at least , the qualifying system was a single car, single lap, two round system where in the first round, everyone would set a time to determine positions 13-32. Then, the fastest 12 qualifiers would move on to the second round to determine positions 1-12.

While Noah Gragson would not the set the fastest time in Round 1 (the honor would go to Matt Crafton of ThorSport Racing), he would set a time fast enough to advance into Round 2. He would proceed to set the fastest time in Round 2 and win the pole for the race.

Myatt Snider of ThorSport Racing would be the only driver not to set a time. During his pole lap, he would spin off of Turn 4. While no damage was caused to the vehicle, he would not set the lap, and take the last starting position.

Camden Murphy of TJL Motorsports would be the only driver not to qualify, finishing just under 3 seconds off of a guaranteed spot and just under 8 tenths of the second to last qualifier, Kyle Donahue of MB Motorsports.

Race results 
Stage 1 Laps: 40

Stage 2 Laps: 40

Stage 3 Laps: 87

References 

2018 NASCAR Camping World Truck Series
NASCAR races at Kansas Speedway
May 2018 sports events in the United States
2018 in sports in Kansas